Thomas Samuel Okker (nicknamed "the Flying Dutchman"; born 22 February 1944) is a Dutch former tennis player who was active from the mid-1960s until 1980. He won the 1973 French Open Doubles, the 1976 US Open Doubles, and two gold medals at the 1965 Maccabiah Games in Israel. He was ranked among the world's top-ten singles players for seven consecutive years, 1968–74, reaching a career high of world No. 3 in 1974. He also was ranked world No. 1 in doubles in 1969.

Early life
Okker was born in Amsterdam, is Jewish on his father's side, and identifies as Jewish. Okker's father was Jewish, and was imprisoned by the Nazis during World War II, but managed to go into hiding by assuming the papers and identity of another man.

Tennis career
He played his first tournament at Wolfsburg, West Germany, on clay in 1963. Okker was the Dutch champion from 1964 through 1968.

In 1968, his first year as a registered professional, he won in singles and in doubles (with Marty Riessen) at the Italian Open. At Wimbledon, Okker reached the quarterfinals in 1968 and the semifinals in 1978. He achieved his best result in a Grand Slam tournament at the 1968 US Open, where he competed as a registered professional player, a professional player allowed to compete for prize money but playing under the control of their national associations and eligible to play in Davis Cup. Okker reached the final after defeating Pancho Gonzales in the quarterfinal and Ken Rosewall in the semifinal. He lost the final to Arthur Ashe in five sets. Okker was awarded the first prize money at the 1968 U.S. Open, as Ashe was still considered an amateur player rather than a registered professional. In February 1969, Okker signed a four-year contract with the Lamar Hunt's World Championship Tennis.

In his career, won 40 singles titles. He also was the runner-up in 37 singles tournaments.

Okker is also among the most successful men's doubles players of all time. He won two Grand Slam doubles titles, at the US Open in 1976 (with Riessen) and the French Open (with John Newcombe) in 1973. In total, Okker won 68 doubles events, a record that was finally broken by Todd Woodbridge in 2005. Okker's other doubles titles include the 1973 Italian Open, 1973 London Grass Courts (with Riessen), 1973 Spanish Open (with Ilie Năstase), 1975 Opel International (with Arthur Ashe), and 1978 WCT World Doubles (with Wojtek Fibak).

One of the first tennis professionals to win at least US$1 million in career prize money, Okker's WTC career earnings stood at $1,257,200 when he retired in 1980 ($ today).

Davis Cup
Between 1964 and 1981, Okker represented the Netherlands in the Davis Cup, playing in 13 ties and accumulating a 15–20 win–loss record.

Maccabiah Games
In 1965, Okker won both the singles and the mixed doubles titles at the 1965 Maccabiah Games in Israel. This event is open to all Israelis and to non-Israeli Jews.

Style of play
He was among the first players of his era to hit the ball with heavy topspin.

Halls of Fame
Okker was inducted into the International Jewish Sports Hall of Fame in 2003.

He was nominated for consideration in 2018, but not inducted into the International Tennis Hall of Fame.

Personal life
Since the mid-1980s Okker has been involved in art and was a founding partner in the Jaski art gallery in Amsterdam, specializing in works of the CoBrA movement. In 2005, he founded art gallery Tom Okker Art bv in Hazerswoude-Dorp, Netherlands, where he now lives.

Grand Slam finals

Singles: 1 (1 runner-up)

Doubles: 5 (2 titles, 3 runner-ups)

Career finals

Singles: 78 (40 titles, 38 runner-ups)

Doubles: 104 (68 titles, 36 runner-ups)

Grand Slam singles performance timeline

See also
 List of select Jewish tennis players

References

External links
 
 
 
 
 Jews in Sports bio

1944 births
Living people
Dutch art dealers
Dutch male tennis players
Dutch people of German-Jewish descent
Jewish tennis players
French Open champions
Competitors at the 1965 Maccabiah Games
Maccabiah Games gold medalists for the Netherlands
US Open (tennis) champions
Businesspeople from Amsterdam
Grand Slam (tennis) champions in men's doubles
International Jewish Sports Hall of Fame inductees
Tennis players from Amsterdam
Maccabiah Games medalists in tennis
People from Hazerswoude
Jewish Dutch sportspeople
ATP number 1 ranked doubles tennis players